Ghulam Rasool Kar (19 June 1921 – 10 April 2015) was an Indian politician from Jammu and Kashmir.

Career
He became a member of the Jammu and Kashmir Constituent Assembly in 1951 and the Jammu and Kashmir Legislative Assembly in 1957. He served as a minister in the Government of Jammu and Kashmir in 1965-71 and 1972-75. He was nominated as a member of Rajya Sabha in 1984 and served till 1987. He was elected as Member of parliament in year 1996. He has served as state chief of Jammu and Kashmir Pradesh Congress Committee.
On 10 April 2015, Ghulam Rasool Kar died at SKIMS after a brief illness at the age of 94.

References

Sources
Brief Biodata

Nominated members of the Rajya Sabha
1921 births
Members of the Jammu and Kashmir Legislature
People from Sopore
2015 deaths
Lok Sabha members from Jammu and Kashmir
India MPs 1996–1997
State cabinet ministers of Jammu and Kashmir
Indian National Congress politicians